{{safesubst:#invoke:RfD|||month = March
|day = 20
|year = 2023
|time = 03:15
|timestamp = 20230320031558

|content=
REDIRECT E. C. Warriner

}}